Trombidium parasiticus is a species of mite in the genus Trombidium in the family Trombidiidae. It is found in Sweden.

References
 Synopsis of the described Arachnida of the World: Trombidiidae

Further reading
  (1778): Mémoirs pour servir à l'histoire des insectes.

Trombidiidae
Arachnids of Europe
Animals described in 1778